Myathropa is a European and North African genus of very common hoverfly. Adults may be seen on flowers from May to September. Larvae feed on bacteria in organic waterlogged detritus, often in the shallow rot holes of tree stumps.

Species
M. florea (Linnaeus, 1758)
M. semenovi Smirnov, 1925
M. usta (Wollaston, 1858)

References

Hoverfly genera
Diptera of Europe
Eristalinae
Taxa named by Camillo Rondani